Zhang Haochen (born 3 February 2000) is a Chinese footballer who plays as a defender for Heilongjiang Ice City.

Club career
Zhang Haochen would play for the Shandong Luneng youth team before going abroad to join Brazilian football team Desportivo Brasil on loan. On 22 September 2018 he would make his senior debut for the club against Red Bull Brasil in a Copa Paulista game that ended in a 3-1 defeat. After his loan ended he was allowed to join newly promoted top tier side Qingdao Huanghai on 15 July 2020. He would go on to make his debut for the club in a Chinese FA Cup game against Beijing Sinobo Guoan F.C. on 19 September 2020 that ended in a 2-1 defeat.

Career statistics

References

External links

2000 births
Living people
Chinese footballers
Chinese expatriate footballers
Association football defenders
Chinese Super League players
Shandong Taishan F.C. players
Desportivo Brasil players
Qingdao F.C. players
Chinese expatriate sportspeople in Brazil
Expatriate footballers in Brazil